Lethrinops stridei is a species of cichlid endemic to Lake Malawi where it occurs at depths of from  in areas with sandy substrates.  This species grows to a length of  SL. The specific name honours Kenneth E. Stride, who introduced successful commercial trawling to Lake Malawi, and this species is now very rare in Lake Malawi and is threatened by overfishing by commercial trawlers.

References

streidei
Fish of Malawi
Fish of Lake Malawi
Fish described in 1977
Taxa named by David Henry Eccles
Taxa named by Digby S. C. Lewis
Taxonomy articles created by Polbot